Studenec is a municipality and village in Semily District in the Liberec Region of the Czech Republic. It has about 1,800 inhabitants.

Administrative parts
Villages of Rovnáčov and Zálesní Lhota are administrative parts of Studenec.

Geography
It lies in the Giant Mountains Foothills. The river Oleška springs in Rovnáčov and flows through the municipality.

History
According to chronicles, in the 11th century, the hill Stráž (literally "guard") under its Latin name Custodius was a guarding point near a trade route. The first written mention of Studenec is from 1395, when it was administered by the nearby Levín Castle. From the early 16th century until 1584, Studenec was a property of the noble Trčka of Lípa family. Another notable owner was Albrecht von Wallenstein, who bought it in 1628, but sold it shortly afterwards.

In the 19th century, the domestic textile production rapidly expanded and Studenec became nicknamed "village of weavers". At the beginning of the 20th century, the village had 2,500 inhabitants and more than 1,200 looms worked in cottages. With the development of industrial production, domestic weaving gradually disappeared. However, its tradition led to the establishment of a weaving mill in 1911, which grew into one of the most important textile companies in pre-war Czechoslovakia under the brand Fejfar & Mládek.

Sights
The landmark of Studenec is the Church of Saint John the Baptist. It current Neoromanesque form dates from 1868.

Notable people
Jiří Šlitr (1924–1969), songwriter, pianist, singer, actor
Květa Jeriová (born 1956), cross-country skier

Twin towns – sister cities

Studenec is twinned with:
 Zuberec, Slovakia

References

External links

Villages in Semily District